Pearl Fuller (March 29, 1881 – September 27, 1908) was an American football player and coach. He served as the head football coach at Alma College in Alma, Michigan, for one season, in 1903, compiling a record of 3–5.

Fuller was born on March 29, 1881, in Alma. In 1903, he married Jennie Quick. He died of pneumonia on September 27, 1908, at his home in Virginia, Minnesota.

References

1881 births
1908 deaths
19th-century players of American football
Alma Scots football coaches
Alma Scots football players
People from Alma, Michigan
Coaches of American football from Michigan
Players of American football from Michigan
Deaths from pneumonia in Minnesota